Juan Oliver may refer to:

Juan Fremiot Torres Oliver (1925–2012), Puerto Rican bishop
Juan García Oliver (1901–1980), Spanish revolutionary
Juan Martínez Oliver (born 1962), Spanish cyclist